P.S. I Luv U is an American crime drama television series that aired on CBS from September 15, 1991 to January 4, 1992 as a part of its 1991–92 schedule. The title derived from the phone number of fictitious Palm Security and Investigations, which was 774-5888, which can be reached by dialing "PSI-LUVU" on a standard North American telephone.

Synopsis
P.S. I Luv U is the story of two people who had been working together in a failed New York Police Department "sting" operation.  Joey Paciorek (Greg Evigan) was a policeman, while Wanda Tallbert (Connie Sellecca) was a con woman who was working with the police only as part of an agreement which was to keep her out of prison.  As the failed sting involved organized crime, when it fell through it became necessary to place both of them in the witness protection program.

Posing as married couple Cody and Dani Powell, the two were placed for employment at Palm Security and Investigations in Palm Springs, California, a private detective agency owned by Matthew Durning (Earl Holliman), who was the only person outside of the government who knew who they really were.  Occasionally seen during the series' run was Sonny Bono, who was at the time the real life mayor of Palm Springs. The series was cancelled at midseason.

Episodes

References
 Brooks, Tim and Marsh, Earle, The Complete Directory to Prime Time Network and Cable TV Shows

External links
 
 

1991 American television series debuts
1992 American television series endings
1990s American crime drama television series
CBS original programming
English-language television shows
Television series by CBS Studios
Television shows set in Palm Springs, California
Television series created by Glen A. Larson